Thelairodoria is a genus of parasitic flies in the family Tachinidae.

Species
Thelairodoria exilis (Wulp, 1890)
Thelairodoria ophthalmica (Wulp, 1890)
Thelairodoria setinervis (Coquillett, 1910)
Thelairodoria thrix Townsend, 1927

References

Diptera of North America
Diptera of South America
Exoristinae
Tachinidae genera
Taxa named by Charles Henry Tyler Townsend